Mühlbacher is a surname. Notable people with the surname include:

Engelbert Mühlbacher (1843–1903), Austrian historian
Gerhard Mühlbacher (born 1975), Austrian luger